Applied ontology involves the practical application of ontological resources to specific domains, such as management, relationships, biomedicine, information science or geography. Much work in applied ontology is carried out within the framework of the Semantic Web.

Applying ontology to relationships
The challenge of applying ontology is ontology's emphasis on a world view orthogonal to epistemology.  The emphasis is on being rather than on doing (as implied by "applied") or on knowing.  This is explored by philosophers and pragmatists like Fernando Flores and Martin Heidegger.

One way in which that emphasis plays out is in the concept of "speech acts": acts of promising, ordering, apologizing, requesting, inviting or sharing.  The study of these acts from an ontological perspective is one of the driving forces behind relationship-oriented applied ontology. This can involve concepts championed by ordinary language philosophers like Ludwig Wittgenstein.

Applying ontology can also involve looking at the relationship between a person's world and that person's actions.  The context or clearing is highly influenced by the being of the subject or the field of being itself.  This view is highly influenced by the philosophy of phenomenology, the works of Heidegger, and others.

Ontological perspectives
Social scientists adopt a number of ontological approaches.  Some of these are:
 Realism - the idea that facts are "out there" just waiting to be discovered;
 Empiricism - the idea that we can observe the world and evaluate those observations in relation to facts;
 Positivism - which focuses on the observations themselves, attentive more to claims about facts than to facts themselves;
 Grounded theory - which claims to derive theories from facts;
 Engaged theory - which moves across different levels of interpretation, linking different empirical questions to ontological understandings;
 Postmodernism - which regards facts as fluid and elusive, and recommends focusing only on observational claims.

See also
 Foundation ontology
 Applied philosophy
 John Searle
 Bertrand Russell
 Barry Smith, ontologist with a focus on biomedicine
 Nicola Guarino, researcher in the formal ontology of information systems
 Landmark Worldwide, organization that provides training in applied ontology.

References

External links

Applied philosophy
Applied ontology